Beşik Bay (or ) is a small bay on the Aegean shore of Troy, at the mouth of the Hellespont in present-day Asiatic Turkey.

It has been written of since antiquity and throughout the 19th century, and in the 20th was seen as a strategic prize. It played a critical role in the Crimean War, and in the disastrous Gallipoli campaign of World War I.

Bays of Turkey
Landforms of Çanakkale Province